Swedish county road 190 (Swedish: Länsväg 190) is a Swedish county road in the province Västra Götalands län in Sweden. The road is 71 kilometres long.

Places along the road 
 Hjällbo
 Angered
 Rågården
 Torvhög
 Bergum
 Olofstorp
 Gråbo
 Björboholm
 Sjövik
 Gräfsnäs
 Sollebrunn
 Stora Mellby
 Nossebro

County road 190
Transport in Västra Götaland County